The men's long jump event at the 2007 Asian Athletics Championships was held in Amman, Jordan on July 26.

Results

References
Final results

2007 Asian Athletics Championships
Long jump at the Asian Athletics Championships